Pong Nam Ron is the name of several places in Thailand:

Pong Nam Ron district, Chanthaburi province
Pong Nam Ron subdistrict, Pong Nam Ron district, Chanthaburi province
Pong Nam Ron subdistrict municipality, Pong Nam Ron district, Chanthaburi province
Pong Nam Ron subdistrict, Fang district, Chiang Mai province
Pong Nam Ron subdistrict, Khlong Lan district, Kamphaeng Phet province